= Kallipalayam, Coimbatore =

Town in Tamil Nadu, India

Coordinates: 11°06′56″N 77°03′54″E

Kallipalayam is a small town in Coimbatore district of Tamil Nadu state in India. In 2011, it had a population of 2821.
